Ol Kalou Constituency is an electoral constituency in Kenya. It is one of five constituencies in Nyandarua County. The constituency was established for the 1997 elections.

Members of Parliament 

OL'KALOU CONSTITUENCY 2022 PARLIAMENTARY CANDIDATES.

1. Peter Kimari Githaiga-TSP
2. David Njuguna Kiaraho -Jubilee
3. Geoffrey Githaiga Wachira-Safina
4. Sammy Kamau - UDA

Wards

References

External links 

Constituencies in Nyandarua County
Constituencies in Central Province (Kenya)
1997 establishments in Kenya
Constituencies established in 1997